The Leopard 2 is a third generation German main battle tank (MBT). Developed by Krauss-Maffei in the 1970s, the tank entered service in 1979 and replaced the earlier Leopard 1 as the main battle tank of the West German army. Various iterations of the Leopard 2 continue to be operated by the armed forces of Germany, as well as 13 other European countries, and several non-European states around the world, including Canada, Chile, Indonesia, and Singapore. Some operating states have licensed the Leopard 2 design for local production and domestic development.

There are two main development tranches of the Leopard 2. The first encompasses tanks produced up to the Leopard 2A4 standard and are characterised by their vertically faced turret armour. The second tranche, from Leopard 2A5 onwards, has an angled, arrow-shaped, turret appliqué armour, together with other improvements. The main armament of all Leopard 2 tanks is a smoothbore 120 mm cannon made by Rheinmetall. This is operated with a digital fire control system, laser rangefinder, and advanced night vision and sighting equipment. The tank is powered by a V12 twin-turbo diesel engine made by MTU Friedrichshafen.

In the 1990s, the Leopard 2 was used by the German Army on peacekeeping operations in Kosovo. In the 2000s, Dutch, Danish and Canadian forces deployed their Leopard 2 tanks in the Afghanistan War as part of their contribution to the International Security Assistance Force. In the 2010s, Turkish Leopard 2 tanks saw action in Syria. In the 2020s, Leopard 2 tanks donated by Canada and European countries will likely see action in the Russian–Ukrainian war.

History

Development
Even as the Leopard 1 was just entering service, the West German military was interested in producing an improved tank in the next decade. This resulted in the start of the MBT-70 development in cooperation with the United States beginning in 1963. However already in 1967 it became questionable whether the MBT-70 would enter service at any time in the foreseeable future. Therefore, the German government issued the order to research future upgrade options for the Leopard 1 to the German company Porsche in 1967.

This study was named vergoldeter Leopard (Gilded Leopard) and focused on incorporating advanced technology into the Leopard design. The projected upgrades added an autoloader, a coaxial autocannon and an independent commander's periscope. The anti-air machine gun could be operated from inside the vehicle and a TV surveillance camera was mounted on an extendable mast. The shape of the turret and hull was optimised using cast steel armour, while the suspension, transmission, and engine exhaust vents were improved.

Prototype development

Following the end of the Gilded Leopard study in 1967, the West-German government decided to focus on the Experimentalentwicklung (experimental development) in a feasibility study and to develop new components for upgrading the Leopard 1 and for use on a future main battle tank programme. At first 25 million DM were invested, but after the industry came to the conclusion that with such a low budget the development of the two projected testbeds was not possible, a total of 30 to 32 million DM was invested. The experimental development was contracted to the company Krauss-Maffei, but with the obligation to cooperate with Porsche for the development of the chassis and with Wegmann for the development of the turret.

Two prototypes with different components were built with the aim of improving the conception of Leopard 1 in such a way that it would match the firepower requirements of the MBT-70. The resulting vehicles were nicknamed Keiler ("tusker"). Two prototypes (ET 01 and ET 02) of the Keiler were built in 1969 and 1970, both of them being powered by the MB 872 engine.

The MBT-70 was a revolutionary design, but after large cost overruns and technological problems, Germany withdrew from the project in 1969. After unsuccessful attempts at saving the MBT-70 by conceptual changes in order to eliminate the biggest issue—the driver being seated in the turret—it became clear in late 1969 that Germany would stop the bi-national development. The assistant secretary of the military procurement division of the German Ministry of Defence suggested reusing as many technologies developed for the MBT-70 as possible in a further programme, which was nicknamed Eber ("boar") due to his being named Eberhardt. The Eber used a modified MBT-70 turret and hull, with the driver being seated in the hull. Only a wooden mock-up was made.

One year later, a choice was made to continue the development based on the earlier Keiler project of the late 1960s, instead of finishing the development of the Eber. In 1971, the name of the design was determined as Leopard 2 with the original Leopard retroactively becoming the Leopard 1, and Paul-Werner Krapke became the project officer of the Leopard 2 program. Originally two versions were projected: the gun-armed Leopard 2K and the Leopard 2FK, which would be armed with the XM150 gun/launcher weapon of the MBT-70.

In 1971 17 prototypes were ordered, but only 16 hulls were built as the production of hull PT12 was cancelled. Ten were ordered initially before another seven were ordered. The 17 turrets were designated T1 to T17, and the hulls were designated PT1 to PT11 and PT13 to PT17. To test a larger number of components and concepts, each prototype was fitted with components not found on the other prototypes. Ten of the turrets were equipped with 105 mm smoothbore guns and the other seven prototypes were equipped with a 120 mm smoothbore gun.

Hulls PT11 and PT17 were fitted with a hydropneumatic suspension based on the MBT-70 design. The running gears of these two hulls had only six road wheels. Different types of auxiliary power units (APUs) were mounted in the prototypes. All turrets were equipped with a machine gun for air defence, except the turret mounted on PT11, where a 20 mm remotely operated autocannon was mounted. With the exception of hulls PT07, PT09, PT15, and PT17, all prototypes used the MB 873 engine. The road wheels were taken from the MBT-70 and the return rollers from the Leopard 1. The welded turret utilised spaced armour formed by two steel plates. The prototypes were equipped with an EMES-12 optical rangefinder and fire control system, which later was adopted on the Leopard 1A4.

In mid-1973 a new turret was designed by Wegmann saving  weight. It was nicknamed the Spitzmaus-Turm (shrew turret) due to the highly sloped front. This design was only possible with the new EMES-13 optical rangefinder, which required a base length of only  instead of the previous . Based on experiences in the Yom Kippur War, a higher level of protection than the prototypes' heavily sloped spaced armour was demanded in late 1973 and the Spitzmaus-Turm was never produced.

The T14 turret was modified to test a new armour configuration, taking on a blockier-looking appearance as a result of using vertical modules of spaced multilayer armour. It was also used to test the new EMES-13 optical rangefinder. The modified T14 turret was designated T14 mod. and was fitted with a fully electric turret drive and stabilization system, which was developed jointly by General Electric and AEG Telefunken.

American evaluation of Leopard 2AV and XM1 Abrams 
In July 1973 German Federal Minister of Defence Georg Leber and his US counterpart James R. Schlesinger agreed upon a higher degree of standardisation in main battle tanks being favourable to NATO. By integrating components already fully developed by German companies for the Leopard 2, the costs of the XM1 Abrams, U.S. prototype tank developed after the MBT-70, could be reduced. A German commission was sent to the US to evaluate the harmonisation of components between the XM1 and Leopard 2. However, under American law it was not possible for a public bidder to interfere in a procurement tender after a contract with intention of profits and deadline was awarded to private sector companies.

As a result, the modification of the Leopard 2 prototypes in order to meet the US Army requirements was investigated. Following a number of further talks, a memorandum of understanding (MOU) was signed on 11 December 1974 between Germany and the US, which declared that a modified version of the Leopard 2 should be trialed by the US against their XM1 prototypes, after the Americans had bought and investigated prototype PT07 in 1973. The MOU obliged the Federal Republic of Germany to send a complete prototype, a hull, a vehicle for ballistic tests and a number of special ballistic parts to the US, where they would be put through US testing procedures for no additional costs.

The Leopard 2AV (austere version) was based on the experiences of the previous Leopard 2 development. It was created in order to meet the US requirements and the latest protection requirements of the German MoD. The T14 mod turret was used as the base for the Leopard 2AV's turret, but meeting the required level of protection for the hull required several attempts until the final ballistic trials on 23 to 26 June 1976. Following the US' preference of laser rangefinders, the turret of prototype PT19 was fitted with a laser rangefinder developed together with the American company Hughes.

In comparison with the earlier Leopard 2 prototypes, the fire control system was simplified by replacing the EMES-12 optical rangefinder and removing the crosswind sensor, the air pressure and temperature sensors, the powder temperature sensor, the PERI R12 commander sight with IR searchlight, the short-range grenade launcher for use against infantry, the retractable searchlight, the spotlight, the retractable passive night vision sight, the APU and the mechanical loading assistant.

Due to the design and production of the Leopard 2AV taking more time than expected, the shipment to the US and the US evaluation was delayed. It was not possible to test the Leopard 2AV before 1 September 1976. Despite the German wish that the Leopard 2AV and the XM1 prototypes would be evaluated at the same time, the US Army decided not to wait for the Leopard 2AV and tested the XM1 prototypes from Chrysler and General Motors beforehand.

Two new prototype hulls and three turrets were shipped to the US: PT20 mounting a 105 mm rifled L7 gun and a Hughes fire control system, PT19 with the same fire control system but able to swap out the gun for the 120 mm Rheinmetall smoothbore gun, and the PT21 fitted with the Krupp Atlas Elektronik EMES-13 fire control system and the 120 mm Rheinmetall gun. The Leopard 2AV fully met the US requirements. A study made by the American FMC Corporation showed that it was possible to produce the Leopard 2AV under licence in America without exceeding the cost limits set by the US Army. Before the trials were finished, it was decided that instead of the US Army possibly adopting the Leopard 2AV, the focus was shifted to the possibilities of common components between the two tanks. FMC, after having acquired the licenses for the production of the Leopard 2AV, decided not to submit a technical proposal, as they saw little to no chance for the US Army adopting a vehicle not developed in the US.

The US Army evaluation showed that on the XM1 a larger portion of the tank's surface was covered by special armour than on the Leopard 2AV. Differences in armour protection were attributed to the different perceptions of the expected threats and the haste in which the Leopard 2AV was designed to accommodate special armour. On mobility trials the Leopard 2AV performed equal to better than the XM1 prototypes. The AGT-1500 turbine engine proved to consume about 50% more fuel and the Diehl tracks had a higher endurance, while the tracks used on the XM1 prototypes failed to meet the Army's requirements. The heat signature of the MTU diesel engine was much lower. The fire control system and the sights of the Leopard 2 were considered to be better and the 120 mm gun proved to be superior. The projected production costs for one XM1 tank were $728,000 in 1976, and the costs for one Leopard 2AV were $56,000 higher.

After the American evaluation of the Leopard 2AV and the US Army's decision to opt for the XM1 Abrams, both American and German sources blamed the other side. According to American literature, it was discovered that the Leopard 2AV prototype used for mobility trials was underweight.

In Germany, the test conditions were criticised for being unrealistic and favouring the XM1. Instead of using actual performance data, the calculated hypothetical acceleration was used. The XM1 was found to have a slightly higher rate of fire despite having internal layouts similar to the Leopard 2AV because the XM1 prototypes were manned by professional crews, while the Leopard 2AV had to be manned by conscripts in order to prove that the Leopard 2AV was not too complicated. Firing on the move was demonstrated on flat tracks, which nullified the better stabilization systems of the Leopard 2AV.

Series production

Various changes were applied to the Leopard 2 design before the series production started in 1979. The engine, transmission, and suspension were slightly modified and improved. The ballistic protection of the turret and hull was improved and weak spots were eliminated.

The turret bustle containing the ready ammunition racks and the hydraulic system was separated from the crew compartment and fitted with blowout panels. The development of several new components was introduced to the Leopard 2 during the Leopard 2AV development and after the US testing was completed. For the series version, the Hughes-designed laser rangefinder made with US Common Modules was chosen over the passive EMES-13 rangefinder. The EMES-13 system was considered to be the superior solution, but the Hughes system was cheaper and fully developed.

The German company Krupp-Atlas-Elektronik acquired the licence of the Hughes design and modified it to meet the needs of the German army. The modified rangefinder received the designation EMES-15. The installation of the US AGT-1500 turbine engine in the Leopard 2 was tested by MaK. The AGT-1500 was from the United States and required deep modifications to the Leopard 2's chassis. However, driving tests at the WTD 41 revealed a number of drawbacks such as high fuel consumption and the poor performance of the transmission including the brakes. This project was thus terminated.

In January 1977 Germany ordered a small pre-series of three hulls and two turrets which were delivered in 1978. These vehicles had increased armour protection on the front of the hull. One of the hulls was fitted with the earlier T21 turret and was used by the German army school in Munster for troop trials until 1979. In September 1977, 1,800 Leopard 2 tanks were ordered, to be produced in five batches. The main contractor was Krauss-Maffei, but Maschinenbau Kiel (MaK) was awarded a contract for producing 45% of the tanks. The first batch consisted of 380 tanks. The delivery of six tanks was scheduled for 1979, 114 for 1980, 180 for 1981, and 300 tanks each following year.

The first series-production tank was delivered on 25 October 1979. By 1982, all of the first batch of 380 Leopard 2 tanks had been completed. 209 were built by Krauss-Maffei (chassis no. 10001 to 10210) and 171 by MaK (chassis no. 20001 to 20172). The first production tanks were fitted with the PzB-200 image intensifier due to production shortages of the new thermal night-sight system, which was later retrofitted to the earlier models. After the original five batches, three further batches of Leopard 2 tanks were ordered, increasing the number of Leopard 2 tanks ordered by Germany to a total of 2,125. The sixth batch was ordered in June 1987 and consisted of 150 tanks, which were produced between January 1988 and May 1989. The seventh batch of 100 tanks was produced between May 1988 and April 1990. The last batch for the German army totalling 75 tanks was produced from January 1991 to March 1992.

During its production run during the Cold War, 16 Leopard 2 tanks were being produced per month. The vehicles were produced at a slower rate in the following decades, however KMW still retained the capacity to return to such manufacturing levels should they need to be made again at a higher rate and supply chains are able to deliver sufficient materials.

Further improvements 
While previous models only varied in detail, the Leopard 2A4 introduced a digital ballistic computer and an improved fire extinguishing system. Starting with the sixth batch, tanks were fitted with an improved armour array and new side skirts. In 1984 the German military procurement agency stated a number of requirements for a future Leopard 2 upgrade. In 1989, the Kampfwertsteigerung (combat potential improvement) programme was initiated in Germany with the delivery of first prototypes. The official military requirements were published in March 1990.

The KWS programme was projected to consist of three stages. The first stage replaced the Rheinmetall 120 mm L/44 gun barrel and the corresponding gun mount with a longer barrelled and more lethal L/55 version. This stage was adopted in the form of 225 Leopard 2A6 tanks, starting in 2001 and lasting until 2005. Stage 2 focused on improvements of armour protection and survivability: it was adopted in the form of the Leopard 2A5, starting in 1995. The base armour of the tank was exchanged and additional armour modules were installed at the turret. The first batch of 225 Leopard 2 tanks was upgraded to Leopard 2A5 configuration between 1995 and 1998; a second batch of 125 followed from 1999 to 2002.

The third stage was the planned replacement of the Leopard 2 turret by a new turret fitted with a 140 mm NPzK tank gun, an autoloader, and the IFIS battlefield management system. The ballistic protection at the hull was to be improved. Originally a total requirement for 650 Leopard 2 tanks with KWS 3 was projected. It was never finalised, but the 140 mm NPzK tank gun was tested on an older prototype. In 1995 it was decided to cancel due to changes in the political environment. The funds were redirected to the Neue Gepanzerte Plattformen (New Armored Platforms) project of the German army. The Leopard 2A6M was developed with a kit providing enhanced protection against mines that can detonate below the hull (like mines with bending wire triggers) and explosively formed penetrator mines. The weight of the Leopard 2A6M is 62.5 tonnes.

The latest version of the tank is the Leopard 2A7, which entered service in an initial batch of 20 tanks in 2014. Already before the first Leopard 2A7 tank was handed over to the German Army, plans for upgrades were made. At this time an "extensive" increase in combat value, while retaining the original mobility of the Leopard 2, was planned. The optics of the tank will also be improved.

In April 2015, Welt am Sonntag claimed that tungsten (wolfram) rounds used in Leopard 2 cannot penetrate the Russian T-90 or the modernized version of the T-80. They also stated that the German military will develop a new improved round, but it will be exclusively developed for the Leopard 2A7.

In 2015 Rheinmetall disclosed that it was developing a new 130 mm smoothbore gun for the Leopard 2 tank and its successor. This gun will offer a 50% increase in performance and penetration. Marketing for the new gun was slated to begin in 2016.

Replacement 
The Leopard 2 first entered service in 1979, and its service life is anticipated to end around 2030. In May 2015, the German Ministry of Defence announced plans to develop a tank jointly with France as a successor to both the Leopard 2 and Leclerc tanks.  Technologies and concepts will be investigated to determine what capabilities are needed in a future tank. Deployment of the new tank, titled Main Ground Combat System (MGCS), will be preceded by incremental upgrades to the Leopard 2, including a new digital turret core system and situational awareness system and an active protection system (APS).

A short-term lethality increase will come from a higher pressure 120 mm gun firing new ammunition, expected to deliver 20 percent better performance than the L/55.  Mid-term efforts will focus on a Rheinmetall 130 mm cannon concept offering 50 percent better armour penetration.  With the Russian T-14 Armata being equipped with the Afghanit, an active protection system designed to mitigate the effectiveness of ATGM, more importance is being placed on direct-fire weapons.

Design

Protection

The Leopard 2 uses spaced multilayer armour throughout the design. The armour consists of a combination of steel plates of different hardness, elastic materials, and other non-metallic materials. Steel plates with high hardness and high ductility are used. The armour is a result of extensive research about the formation and penetration mechanism of shaped charge jets. The Leopard 2's armour might be based on the British Burlington armour, which had already been demonstrated to West Germany in 1970.

Later, in the mid-1970s, full details about Burlington were handed over to the West German government. The frontal arc of the Leopard 2's armour is designed to withstand large caliber kinetic energy penetrators and shaped charge projectiles. During the 1980s, it was estimated that the Leopard 2's front would resist 125 mm armour-piercing fin-stabilized discarding sabot (APFSDS) rounds fired from a distance of 1,500 m.

The Leopard 2A4's armour has a maximum physical thickness of  based on unofficial measurements and estimates made by former conscripts and professional soldiers of the German army.

The side and the rear of the tank protect against heavy machine guns, medium caliber rounds, and older types of tank ammunition. The side of the hull is covered by armour skirts to increase protection against projectiles and rocket-propelled grenades (RPGs). The frontal third of the hull sides is covered by heavy ballistic skirts, while the rest of the hull sides is covered by steel-reinforced rubber skirts. For increased protection against mines, the sides of the hull floor are sloped by 45° and the floor is reinforced with corrugations.

Secondary protection

The Leopard 2's design follows the concept of compartmentation. Possible sources of fire or explosions have been moved away from the crew. In the turret, the ammunition and the hydraulics are located in compartments separated from the crew. In case of a detonation, the blow-off panels on the compartment roofs will direct the explosion and fire away from the crew.

Two groups of four Wegmann 76 mm smoke mortars are mounted on either side of the turret and can be electrically fired either as single rounds or in salvos of four. They are mounted on most Leopard 2 models, with the exception of Dutch Leopard 2s, which are equipped instead with a Dutch-designed smoke mortar system with six barrels on each side. Swedish Stridsvagn 122 utilises French GALIX smoke dispensers, similar to the system found on the French Leclerc.

The Leopard 2 is equipped with a fire protection system. Four 9 kg halon fire extinguisher bottles are installed on the right behind the driver's station. The bottles are connected to pipes and hoses and are activated automatically by the fire detection system when temperatures rise above  inside the fighting compartment, or manually via a control panel in the driver's compartment. An extra 2.5 kg halon fire extinguisher is stored on the floor beneath the main gun.

Armour upgrades

Following Leopard 2's introduction into service in 1979, the armour has been gradually improved over the years. A modified version of spaced multilayer armour was introduced beginning with the 97th vehicle of the 6th production batch. The same batch also introduced an improved type of heavy ballistic skirts.

The Leopard 2A5 upgrade focused on increased armour protection. While upgrading a Leopard 2 tank to the Leopard 2A5 configuration, the roof covering the armour modules is cut open and new armour modules are inserted. New additional armour modules made of laminated armour cover the frontal arc of the turret. They have a distinctive arrowhead shape and improve protection against both kinetic penetrators and shaped charges. The side skirts also incorporate improved armour protection. A 25 mm-thick spall liner reduces the danger of crew injuries in case of armour penetration.

The Leopard 2A7 features the latest generation of passive armour and belly armour providing protection against mines and IEDs. The Leopard 2A7 is fitted with adapters for mounting additional armour modules or protection systems against RPGs.

For urban combat, the Leopard 2 can be fitted with different packages of modular armour. The Leopard 2A4M CAN, Leopard 2 PSO (Peace Support Operations) and the Leopard 2A7 can mount thick modules of composite armour along the flanks of the turret and hull, while slat armour can be adapted at the vehicle's rear. The Leopard 2A6M CAN increases protection against rocket-propelled grenades (RPGs) by including additional slat armour.

Additional armour packages have been developed by a number of different companies. IBD Deisenroth has developed upgrades with MEXAS and Advanced Modular Armor Protection (AMAP) composite armour, the latter is being used on Singaporean and Indonesian Leopard 2 tanks. RUAG has developed an armour upgrade utilizing their SidePRO-ATR composite armour. This upgrade was first presented on the IAV 2013.

The Leopard 2A4M and 2A6M add an additional mine protection plate for the belly, which increases protection against mines and IEDs.

On 22 February 2021, the German Defence Ministry agreed to acquire Trophy, an active protection system of Israeli design. 17 German Army tanks will be fitted with the system, with integration planned to be completed in 2023.

Armour protection estimates
Estimated levels of protection for the Leopard 2 range from 590 to 690 mm RHAe on the turret, 600 mm RHAe on the glacis and lower front hull on the Leopard 2A4, to 920–940 mm RHAe on the turret, 620 mm RHAe on the glacis and lower front hull on the Leopard 2A6 against kinetic projectiles.

According to a description page hosted by the Federation of American Scientists, the armour of the Leopard 2A4 is believed to provide protection equivalent to 700 mm armour steel (RHA) against kinetic energy penetrators and 1000 mm RHA against shaped charge warheads.

Armament

Primary
The primary armament for production versions of the Leopard 2 is the Rheinmetall 120 mm smoothbore gun—the same gun later adapted for use on the M1 Abrams—in either the L/44 variant (found on all production Leopard 2s until the A5), or the L/55 variant (as found on the Leopard 2A6 and subsequent models). Ammunition for the gun comprises 27 rounds stored in a special magazine in the forward section of the hull, to the left of the driver's station, with an additional 15 rounds stored in the left side of the turret bustle, which is separated from the fighting compartment by an electrically operated door.

If the ammunition storage area is hit, a blow-off panel in the turret roof would direct an explosion upwards away from the crew compartment.

For the L/55 gun, a newer APFSDS-T round was introduced to take advantage of the longer barrel, the DM-53, which is said to be able to penetrate 750 mm of RHAe armour at a range of 2,000 meters. The bore evacuator and the gun's thermal sleeve of the A4 and A5, designed to regulate the temperature of the barrel, are fabricated from glass-reinforced plastic. The barrel has a chrome lining to increase barrel life. The main gun is capable of power elevating from +20° to −9°.

Rheinmetall has developed an upgrade for Leopard 2 tanks to give them the ability to fire the Israeli LAHAT anti-tank guided missile through the main gun.

Secondary
The Leopard 2 is equipped with two machine guns, one mounted co-axially, the other on an anti-aircraft mount. German models use the MG 3 7.62 mm machine gun; Dutch and Singaporean models use FN MAG 7.62 mm machine guns; Swiss models use Swiss MG 87 7.5 mm machine guns. 4,750 rounds of machine gun ammunition are carried on board the Leopard 2. More recent variants such as the Leopard 2A7+ are capable of mounting a Remotely-Controlled Weapons Station fitted with a Browning M2HB Heavy Machine Gun, near the commander's hatch.

Fire control
The standard fire control system found on the Leopard 2 is the German EMES 15 fire control system with a dual magnification stabilised primary sight. The primary sight has an integrated neodymium yttrium aluminium garnet Nd:YAG laser rangefinder and a 120 element Mercury cadmium telluride, HgCdTe (also known as CMT) Zeiss thermographic camera, both of which are linked to the tank's fire control computer. A backup 8x auxiliary telescope FERO-Z18 is mounted coaxially for the gunner.

The commander has an independent periscope, the Rheinmetall/Zeiss PERI-R 17 A2. This is a stabilised panoramic periscope sight designed for day/night observation and target identification. It provides an all round view with a traverse of 360°. The thermal image from the commander's periscope is displayed on a monitor inside the tank. Initial production tanks were not equipped with a thermal sight, due to the sight not being ready, and instead temporarily substituted the PZB 200 low light TV system (LLLTV).

The fire control suite is capable of providing up to three range values in four seconds. The range data is transmitted to the fire control computer and is used to calculate the firing solution. Because the laser rangefinder is integrated into the gunner's primary sight, the gunner is able to read the digital range measurement directly. The maximum range of the laser rangefinder is up to 10,000 m with a measuring accuracy within 10 m at this range. The combined system allows the Leopard 2 to engage moving targets at ranges of up to 5,000 meters whilst itself being on the move over rough terrain.

Propulsion

The Leopard 2 is propelled by the MTU MB 873 Ka-501 engine. The MTU MB 873 Ka-501 is a four-stroke, 47.7 litre, 90° V-block 12-cylinder, twin-turbocharged and intercooled, liquid-cooled diesel engine (with multi-fuel capability). It has an estimated fuel consumption rate of around 300 litres per 100 km on roads and 500 litres per 100 km across the country, and is coupled to the Renk HSWL 354 gear and brake system.

The Renk HSWL 354 transmission has four forward and two reverse gears, with a torque converter and is completely automatic, with the driver selecting the range. The Leopard 2 has four fuel tanks, which have a total capacity of approximately 1,160 litres, giving a maximum road range of about 500 km. The propulsion pack is capable of driving the tank to a top road speed of 68 km/h (limited to 50 km/h during peacetime by law), and a top reverse speed of 31 km/h. The power pack can be changed in the field in 35 minutes. The engine and transmission are separated from the crew compartment through a fireproof bulkhead. An enhanced version of the EuroPowerPack, with a  MTU MT883 engine has been trialled by the Leopard 2.

The Leopard 2 has a torsion bar suspension and has advanced friction dampers. The running gear consists of seven dual rubber-tired road wheels and four return rollers per side, with the idler wheel at the front and drive sprocket at the rear. The tracks are Diehl 570F tracks, with rubber-bushed end connectors, which have removable rubber pads and use 82 links on each track. For use in icy ground, up to 18 rubber pads can be replaced by the same number of grousers, which are stored in the vehicle's bow when not in use. The upper part of the tracks are covered with side skirts.

It can climb vertical obstacles over one metre high.

The German Army has prioritised mobility in the Leopard 2, which has made it one of the fastest MBTs in the world.

Exports
Germany has fielded about 2,125 Leopard 2 main battle tanks in various versions, but many were sold following German reunification. The Leopard 2 became very popular in the 1990s, when the shrinking German army offered many of its redundant Leopard 2s at a reduced price. It became successful enough in Europe that the manufacturer started calling it the Euro Leopard, despite France, Britain, and Italy all operating their own MBTs. With further non-European orders, the name "Global-Leopard" is now used instead. Leopard 2 tanks have also been resold by original export customers, although reexport has always been conditional on consent from the German government who control the platform's export licence. Other countries have bought newly manufactured vehicles or have produced them locally under licence.

Europe

The Netherlands ordered 445 Leopard 2 tanks on 2 March 1979, after examining the results of the Leopard 2AV in the United States. It became the first export customer of the Leopard 2 and the vehicles were delivered between July 1981 and July 1986. Dutch Leopard 2 tanks have been subsequently exported to Austria, Canada, Norway, and Portugal. Leopard 2 tanks remaining in Dutch service have been upgraded to 2A5 and 2A6 standards.

The Swiss Army decided to purchase Leopard 2 tanks over the M1A1 Abrams after trialling both tanks between August 1981 and June 1982. The Swiss decision was made in August 1983 and the funding was approved by the government in 1984. Thirty-five of the tanks were delivered by Kraus-Maffei by June 1987. Eidgenössische Konstruktionswerkstätte Thun started license production of 345 additional vehicles in December 1987.

After investigating the option of a locally developed replacement for the Strv 103 tank, Sweden decided to buy a foreign tank model. The Leopard 2 Improved (Leopard 2A5 prototype) won the competition against the M1A2 Abrams and the French Leclerc. The Swedish military also evaluated the Soviet T-80U tank, but separately from the other tanks. After intensive tests from January to June 1994, the Swedish military opted for the Leopard 2.  The Swedish military found that the Leopard 2 Improved met their military demands by 90%. The M1A2 met the Swedish requirements by 86%, whereas the Leclerc met 63%. In June 1994 Sweden ordered the production of 120 modified Leopard 2A5, to be known as Stridsvagn 122 (Strv 122) in Swedish service. Strv 122 features Swedish-developed appliqué armor, a new command system, and improved electronics. Of the 120 Strv 122, 29 were manufactured in Germany by Krauss-Maffei Wegmann while the other 91 were manufactured by the Swedish firms Bofors and Hägglunds. The first Stridsvagn 122 was delivered in December 1996. These remain in Swedish service and have received periodic upgrades.

Sweden also leased and later bought a total of 160 Leopard 2A4 tanks in 1994 and 1995, known in Swedish service as Stridsvagn 121 (Strv 121). The first Strv 121 was delivered in February 1994. The Strv 121 fleet was mothballed by 2006. Sweden has retained a number of Strv 121 tanks as training aids; 6 Strv 121 have since been converted into AEV 3 Kodiak amoured engineering vehicles, and a further 6 have been converted into Leguan armoured bridgelayers.

Denmark bought 51 ex-German Leopard 2A4 tanks after the Danish military school, the Hærens Kampskole, recommended basing the adoption of a new tank on the Swedish army trials. The first tanks were delivered in 1998, but the upgrade to Leopard 2A5 level was already decided the next year. In 2004-2006 the Danish army bought another six ex-German Leopard 2 tanks.

In 1998, Greece held a competition to determine the main battle tank for the Hellenic Army. The Leopard 2 Improved managed to outperform the Challenger 2E, Leclerc, M1A2 Abrams, T-80U, and T-84 and was chosen by the Greek officials. In March 2003 Greece ordered 170 Leopard 2 tanks, of which 140 were locally assembled. Greece also bought 183 Leopard 2A4 and 150 Leopard 1 tanks.

Spain initially leased 109 Leopard 2A4 tanks, after Krauss-Maffei withdrew from the Lince development, a special lighter version of the Leopard 2 developed together with Santa Bárbara Sistemas. Before the end of the Lince tank, Spain had already rejected the M1A1 Abrams and the Vickers Valiant. After deciding to purchase the leased tanks, Santa Bárbara Sistemas acquired the licence to locally produce 219 Leopard 2A6 tanks for the Spanish army.

Poland received 128 Leopard 2A4 tanks from German army stocks in 2002. In 2013 Poland ordered a further 119 ex-German Leopard 2s. Finland bought 124 used Leopard 2A4 tanks and six armoured bridge-layer Leopard 2L tanks from Germany in 2002 and 2003. The tanks served as replacements for the old Soviet-made T-55 and T-72M1. The Netherlands resold 114 of their tanks (and one turret) to Austria, 80 to Canada in 2007, 52 to Norway, 37 to Portugal and 100 to Finland.

In December 2018, Hungary placed an order for 44 Leopard 2A7+s and 12 second-hand 2A4s. The order coincided with the procurement of 24 Panzerhaubitze 2000, and is expected to replace Hungary's current fleet of T-72 tanks "no sooner than 2020".

The first Leopard 2A7s are due to be delivered by 2026, and operational by 2031. The Norwegian government had been weighing up either the Leopard 2A7 or the South Korean K2 Black Panther as a replacement for its aging Leopard 2A4 fleet.

Beyond Europe
In 2005, Turkey ordered 298 Leopard 2 tanks from German army stocks. The Leopard 2 was chosen in 2001 after successfully competing one year earlier in the Turkish army trials against the T-84 Yatagan, Leclerc and a version of the M1A2 Abrams fitted with a German MTU diesel engine. Turkey wanted to buy 1,000 Leopard 2 tanks in 1999, but the German government rejected the deal.

Singapore bought 96 Leopard 2 tanks from Germany in 2006. Chile bought 172 ex-German Leopard 2A4 tanks and 273 Marder 1A3 IFVs in 2007.

Indonesia ordered 103 Leopard 2 tanks and 42 Marder 1A3 IFVs in 2013. At first the export of heavy weapons to Indonesia was not allowed by the German government, due to the questionable human rights record of Indonesia. 61 of the 103 Leopard 2 tanks will be upgraded by Rheinmetall to the Leopard 2RI standard, based on Rheinmetall's Revolution modular upgrade concept.

Qatar ordered 62 Leopard 2A7 tanks and 24 Panzerhaubitze 2000s in 2013. The delivery of the tanks started in late 2015 and the first tanks were displayed on a military parade in December 2015.

Failed exports
Saudi Arabia has shown interest in buying the Leopard 2 since the 1980s. Due to political circumstances and the questionable situation of human rights in Saudi Arabia, no deal was made. Saudi Arabia renewed its intention of buying Leopard 2 tanks in 2011. While earlier news reports suggested an interest in buying about 200 tanks, later reports revealed an increased order of 600 to 800 tanks. The German government at first approved the deal, but cancelled it later due to human rights concerns and Saudi Arabia's military intervention in the 2011 Bahraini uprising.

The Leopard 2 was tested by the United Kingdom. In 1989 the Leopard 2 was evaluated as a possible replacement for the Challenger 1 tank. Ultimately the British armed forces decided to adopt the locally made Challenger 2.

The Australian Army evaluated ex-Swiss Army Leopard 2s as a replacement for its Leopard 1AS tanks in 2003, but selected the M1A1 AIM instead due to easier logistics. More modern versions of the Leopard 2 or M1 Abrams, such as the Leopard 2A6, were not considered due to their higher price.

Transfer to Ukraine

Political discussions
Since April 2022, in the wake of the Russian invasion, the Ukrainian government has requested that their allies donate Western-made main battle tanks. Poland, Finland and others have all announced a willingness to contribute Leopard 2 tanks from their stocks, with around 100 tanks from various states ready to be transferred to Ukraine. However, when Germany exported the tanks to these countries, it had made reexport conditional on a German government permit, as based on the Kriegswaffenkontrollgesetz and außenwirtschaftsgesetz. Until 22 January 2023, it was unclear whether such a consent would be provided with Germany determined to avoid any perception of escalating the conflict, and wary of being labelled an aggressor. Germany has also been keen to extract an American commitment to provide its own M1 Abrams tanks, before sending German-made Leopard 2 tanks to Ukraine.

The matter was discussed at a conference of defence ministers from NATO members and allies, but no agreement was reached. The German position was heavily criticized by some of the other European governments with Poland threatening to unilaterally export their Leopards if permission from Berlin was not given. The Polish and Ukrainian governments then announced that Ukrainian soldiers would start training on Polish Leopard 2 tanks in Poland.

On 22 January 2023, the German Minister for Foreign Affairs, Annalena Baerbock, told French media that Germany "would not stand in the way" of any Polish decision to send Leopard 2 tanks to Ukraine but noted that "for the moment the question has not been asked." Two days later, Poland made an official request for permission to transfer Polish Leopards to Ukraine.

On 24 January Der Spiegel reported that the German Chancellor, Olaf Scholz, would the following day, officially announce the transfer of an undisclosed number of German Leopard 2 tanks to Ukraine, beginning with 14 Leopard 2A6s from the active Bundeswehr inventory. The German government would also give permission to any country seeking to reexport Leopard 2 tanks to Ukraine. These reports were formally confirmed by the German government on 25 January.

It was also reported that Boris Pistorius, the German defence minister, was encouraging Leopard operating states to start training Ukrainian personnel in their use.

The German decision to provide and approve the provision of Leopard 2 tanks to Ukraine has come after U.S. President Joe Biden decided to provide Ukraine with M1 Abrams tanks, as Germany has insisted on, concluding that it is important to move in lockstep with its allies. The decision to provide M1 Abrams tanks had previously been opposed by the Pentagon.

On 15 February 2023, Pistorius expressed his frustration at Germany's allies in their announcement of any donations of Leopard 2 tanks to Ukraine, saying it had "not been exactly breathtaking, to put it mildly." Since the change in German position on exports, only Poland had matched the German promise to provide 14 tanks - the two largest donations from a single country.

Germany
On 25 January 2023, the German government confirmed that it would make 14 Leopard 2A6 (a company-strength number) available for Ukraine and would give authorisation to European partners to reexport their vehicles. The goal is for European Leopard 2 operators to provide two battalions worth, or 88 tanks, to Ukraine.

According to the German government, the tanks will be delivered to Ukraine after training Ukrainian service men. This process would take up to three months. Some tanks are held by the Bundeswehr, others by the Leopard manufacturer Rheinmetall. The latter has said they could be ready to be dispatched by March 2023. However, they also warned that some vehicles held in long-term storage would require extensive refurbishment and updating before they could be considered suitable for combat in Ukraine. On January 26, Pistorius, the German minister of defense, stated that the tanks would be delivered in late March or early April. On 24 February 2023, the German Department of Defence confirmed Germany would increase its Leopard 2A6 contribution from 14 to 18, thus providing 1 full tank battalion together with the contributions of Portugal and Sweden.

Poland
Poland welcomed the German decision to allow the transfer of Leopard 2 tanks to Ukraine, with the Polish government announcing on 25 January it would transfer 14 Leopards to Ukraine from a total Polish stock of 250, in addition to a further 50–60 Soviet-era tanks. On 24 February 2023, the first 4 Leopard 2A4 tanks from Polish stocks were delivered to Ukraine. These are the first Leopard 2 tanks to be operated by Ukraine.

Canada
On 26 January 2023, the Canadian Defence Minister, Anita Anand, announced that Canada would be sending four Leopard 2A4 tanks to Ukraine, with the potential for more to follow. These vehicles were reportedly 'combat ready.' Canada will also provide appropriate training to Ukrainian forces who will go on to operate these tanks. The first Canadian Leopard 2 tanks had arrived in Poland on 5 February, to allow Ukrainian troops to begin training. On 24 February, the Canadian Prime Minister, Justin Trudeau, announced that Canada would be sending a further four Leopard 2A4 tanks to Ukraine along with 1 armored recovery vehicle (ARV) and 5,000 rounds of ammunition.

Czech Republic
On 20 January 2023 the Czech Defense Ministry issued a statement that the media reports indicating the Czech Republic and Slovakia were willing to give up their Leopard 2 tanks for Ukraine were false, and that rumors that the Czech Republic would receive American Abrams tanks in exchange for Leopards were also false. As of December 2022, both countries had only received 1 Leopard 2A4 each from Rheinmetall as part of Germany's Ringtaush program in exchange for them delivering older Soviet equipment to Ukraine, while the remaining Leopard 2A4s are still being refurbished (expected to be delivered throughout 2023).

Denmark
While it has been reported in the international press that Denmark has signalled that it could contribute a number of tanks, there has been no official indication from the Danish Government that any Danish Leopards 2 will be sent to Ukraine. Of the Danish inventory of 44 tanks, 14 are currently deployed to Estonia as part of NATO EFP, with a further number receiving upgrades from German manufacturers. Some Danish opposition politicians have voiced support for a transfer of Danish tanks. Unlike those being considered by other countries, the Danish Leopard's are of the new 2A7 standard, which would represent some logistic and mechanical challenges compared to the other variants. Denmark instead announced on 7 February that it was jointly purchasing 100-178 Leopard 1A5 tanks with Germany and the Netherlands.

Finland
Finland had suggested before the German decision on reexport, that it could supply Ukraine with a limited number of Leopard 2 tanks. The Finnish President, Sauli Niinistö, warned that "the number of tanks [to be sent to Ukraine] cannot be large, since Finland borders on Russia and is not part of NATO." On 23 February Finland announced it will give 3 Leopard 2R mine clearing vehicles to Ukraine. Finnish total stock of this type will return the same (6) with planned purchase of 3 replacement vehicles from Germany.

Greece
On 25 January 2023 it was reported that Greece was one of the countries that had indicated it would supply Leopard 2 tanks to Ukraine. On 29 January 2023 it was erroneously reported that approximately 14 Leopard 2 tanks would be provided, though it was unclear if it would be the 2A4 or 2A6 HEL variant. However, on 31 January, Greek Prime Minister Kyriakos Mitsotakis clarified that Greece would not supply any Leopard tanks to Ukraine, arguing "they are absolutely necessary for our defense posture."

Netherlands
The Netherlands was considering Ukrainian requests for Leopard 2 tanks, with Prime Minister Mark Rutte suggesting that the Dutch government could purchase tanks from other countries and donate them. There were also some discussions about Netherlands purchasing the 18 Leopard 2A6 tanks they lease from Germany. No refusal was made from Germany to sell them as no formal request to buy them was made; both countries agreed that they were critical to the operations of the joint German-Dutch military unit. However, the Netherlands agreed to supply ammunition for Leopard tanks and announced it had not abandoned its intention to contribute to the tank initiative, while also noting it was helping to purchase Leopard 1A5 tanks with Denmark and Germany.

Norway
on 25 January 2023, Norway pledged to donate spare Leopards to Ukraine with reports speculating that between four and eight of its 36 Leopard 2A4 tanks would be sent. Norwegian defence minister Bjørn Arild Gram said in an interview with Norwegian public television NRK: “Norway and the government support the donation of battle tanks to Ukraine. Norway will take part,” but did not specify how many would be sent. On 14 February 2022, Gram announced that 8 Norwegian Leopard 2 tanks and 4 Leopard 1 or 2 derived 'special purpose vehicles' would be handed over to Ukraine. The special purpose vehicles will be a mix of armoured recovery vehicles and bridgelayers.In February 2023, Norway ordered 54 Leopard 2A7 tanks to be delivered from 2026, with a further option for 18 vehicles if necessary.

Portugal
When the German government changed its position on the reexport of Leopard 2 tanks, it was reported that the Portuguese government was preparing to send four of their Leopard 2A6 tanks to Ukraine. On 4 February, Prime Minister António Costa confirmed that Portugal would send Leopards to Ukraine, but did not confirm the number of vehicles set to be delivered. It is understood that Portugal is working with Germany to obtain the necessary parts to repair inoperable tanks in its inventory of 37 Leopard 2 tanks, but it has been widely reported by local media that most are inoperable. Costa expressed hopes that Portuguese tanks would be delivered by March 2023. On 14 February, it was reported that Portugal had earmarked 3 Leopard 2A6 tanks for donation to Ukraine.

Slovakia
On 25 January 2023, Slovakia announced it was not considering the transfer of any of its Leopard 2A4 tanks to Ukraine, but were willing to provide T-72 tanks if other allies replaced them with other tanks. The reason cited for this was that Slovakia had only received 1 of the 15 Leopard tanks it was promised as part of Germany's Ringtaush program, which it was getting in exchange for supplying Ukraine with 30 Soviet-era infantry fighting vehicles.

Spain
The Spanish government is reported to be considering to send an unconfirmed number of Spanish Leopard 2E tanks to Ukraine. On 14 February the Spanish Defence Minister Margarita Robles confirmed Spain was providing training to 55 Ukrainian tank crew members and technicians on the Leopard 2. On 22 February, the Robles also confirmed that Spain was in the process of preparing six Leopard 2A4 tanks for delivery to Ukraine by late March or early April. On 5 February 2023, it was reported that at least 11 of the 53 tanks stored at Zaragoza had been drawn out of storage to be refurbished and upgraded to have "the same lethality" as modern versions of the Leopard 2 before being sent to Ukraine. Five were sent to the Santa Bárbara Sistemas plant in Alcalá de Guadaíra and six had already been moved to Seville for diagnostics and repairs. The Ministry of Defence had not published the contracts for the retrofits out of secrecy. It was unclear however if ammunition would be supplied with the tanks as Spain only has 9 rounds for each of its Leopard 2E tanks. On 23 February Spanish Prime Minister Pedro Sánchez confirmed during a visit to Kyiv that Spain was sending at least 10 Leopard 2 tanks to Ukraine.

Sweden
Sweden began considering Ukrainian requests for Leopard 2 tanks in January 2023 and did not rule out contributing its Strv 122 at a later stage. On 24 February, the Swedish Minister of Defence Pål Jonson announced that Sweden would be providing 10 Leopard 2A5 tanks to Ukraine.

Combat history

KFOR

Starting on 12 June 1999, 28 Leopard 2A5 tanks were deployed to Kosovo by the German Army as part of the Kosovo Force (KFOR). The vehicles of Panzerbataillon 33 and 214 were sent from Macedonia to Prizren. They were used for patrols, protecting checkpoints and bases as well as part of the show of force. On 13 June 1999, two members of the Serbian paramilitary started firing from inside a Fiat 125p car at one of the checkpoints in Prizren and both were killed by return fire. A Leopard 2A5 was located at the checkpoint, but it could not participate in the fighting as it was only partially crewed.

On 26 June 1999, a Leopard 2A5 fired four warning shots above the town of Orahovac. From late 2000 to early 2001, the tanks were replaced by the Leopard 2A4 model. Leopard 2A4s were deployed to Macedonia in 2001 as part of the NATO intervention. The tanks served to protect Bundeswehr logistic sites in Macedonia. Until their return in 2004, the Leopard 2 tanks were stationed at the Austrian-Swiss camp "Casablanca".

IFOR/SFOR
The Dutch contingent in Bosnia-Herzegovina operated Leopard 2 tanks. Dutch Leopard 2A4s and Leopard 2A5s were stationed at the NLD bases at Bugojno, Novi Travnik, Sisava, Knezevo, Maslovare and Suica.

ISAF/OEF
In October 2003, Canada was planning to replace its Leopard C2s with wheeled Stryker Mobile Gun Systems. However, operational experience in Afghanistan and in particular during Operation Medusa, convinced the Canadian military of the usefulness of maintaining a tank fleet. Leopard C2s were deployed to Kandahar in December 2006, but they were by then almost 30 years old, and were nearing the end of their operational life. The Canadian government decided to borrow 20 Leopard 2A6s and three armoured recovery vehicles from Germany for rapid deployment to Afghanistan. In late August 2007, the first Leopard 2s were airlifted into Afghanistan to equip Lord Strathcona's Horse (Royal Canadians).

In an assault on 2 November 2007, a Leopard 2A6M hit an improvised explosive device (IED) and survived without casualties: "My crew stumbled upon an IED (improvised explosive device) and made history as the first (crew) to test the (Leopard 2A6) M-packet. It worked as it should." wrote a Canadian officer in an email to German defence officials. Canadian Chief of the Defence Staff General Rick Hillier denied reports that a Leopard 2 tank that was struck by an IED was a write-off, insisting that the tank has been repaired and is once again in use. "The Taliban have been engaged with some of the new Leopard 2 tanks in several ambushes" and that as a result the Taliban "learned some very harsh lessons" and lost the battle in question "very quickly and very violently."

In October 2007, Denmark deployed Leopard 2A5 DKs in support of operations in southern Afghanistan. The Danish tank unit, drawn from the first battalion of the Jydske Dragonregiment (Jutland Dragoons Regiment), was equipped with three tanks and one M113 armored personnel carrier, with an armoured recovery vehicle and another tank kept in reserve. The Danish version of the Leopard 2A5 is fitted with Swedish-made Barracuda camouflage mats that limit the absorption of solar heat, thus reducing infrared signature and interior temperature. It also has a conventional driver's seat bolted on the floor of the tank, whereas in the Canadian 2A6M (as part of the mine-protection package) the driver's seat has been replaced by a "dynamic safety seat", which is a parachute-harness like an arrangement that the driver wears around his hip. This way, the driver does not have any contact with the hull except on the pedals and is out of the shockwave area of exploding land mines or IEDs.

In January 2008, Danish tanks halted a flanking manoeuvre by Taliban forces near the Helmand River by providing gunfire in support of Danish and British infantry from elevated positions. On 26 February 2008, a Danish Leopard 2 was hit by an explosive device, damaging one track. No one was injured and the tank returned to camp on its own for repairs. The first fatality suffered by a crew operating a Leopard 2 happened on 25 July 2008. A Danish Leopard 2A5 hit an IED in Helmand Province. The vehicle was able to continue  before it halted. Three members of the four-man crew were able to escape even though wounded, but the driver was stuck inside. On-site treatment by Danish medics could not save him. The vehicle was towed to Forward Operating Base (FOB) Attal and then later to FOB Armadillo for investigation and possible redeployment. During the same contact with Taliban forces, a second tank was caught in an explosion but none of the crew were wounded.

Beginning on 7 December 2008, Leopard 2 tanks took part in Operation Red Dagger, firing 31 rounds in support of Coalition troops as they recaptured Nad Ali District. A press release from the British Ministry of Defence praised the tank's fire accuracy and mobility, claiming the Leopard 2 was a decisive factor in the coalition's success.

Turkish intervention in Syria
Turkey operates 354 Leopard 2A4 tanks. Initially using other tank types including upgraded M60s, in December 2016 Turkey deployed a number of Leopard 2A4s to the Syrian Civil War against Islamic State of Iraq and the Levant (ISIS) as part of Operation Euphrates Shield. Initially, three of the Turkish Leopard 2A4s operating in Syria were destroyed or damaged by ISIS using anti-tank missile systems (possibly Fagot or Konkurs anti-tank guided missiles obtained from Syrian or Iraqi Army captured stocks). In mid-December 2016, two 2A4 tanks were captured by ISIS near al-Bab city in Syria during Euphrates Shield operations. Amaq News Agency posted video of vehicles claimed to be captured Leopard 2A4s.

By late December 2016, ISIS had captured or incapacitated 10 Leopard 2A4s. These were damaged by anti-tank weapons, IEDs, or other unknown causes. Additional ISIS propaganda images and video depicting several completely destroyed Leopards, some with their turrets blown off, were published in January 2017. Tanks which suffered the worst damage may have been destroyed by airstrikes in order to prevent capture but sources generally state that the damage was caused solely with anti-tank missiles or car bombs driven by suicide bombers.

In January 2017, the German newspaper Die Welt reported that ISIL fighters used 9M133 Kornet anti-tank missiles to destroy six Leopard 2 tanks used by the Turkish military in Syria.

At least eight Leopard 2 MBT have been destroyed according to photographic reports.

Turkey also confirmed the use of Leopard 2A4 tanks during the Turkish military operation in Afrin to the German government. These tanks were designed during the Cold War to fight against Soviet tanks in Europe, not counterinsurgencies against guerrillas, where the primary risk is improvised explosive devices and anti-tank missiles. These tanks were retired from German usage when sold to Turkey.

There is a belief that the Turkish purchase of Leopard 2A4s from Germany was subject to the condition that they were not to be used against Kurdish separatists. Prior to 2016, the Leopard 2A4s were kept in northern Turkey. Once the German government discovered that the Leopard tanks were being used against Kurdish forces, planned upgrades to make them “less vulnerable to explosives” were halted. Ultimately Turkey was forced to upgrade the Leopard 2A4s with domestic components, including a possible replacement of the original turret with that of the Turkish Altay main battle tank.

Variants

Leopard 2
The baseline Leopard 2, sometimes informally called the "A0" to differentiate it from later versions, was the first series manufactured version. The vehicles were manufactured from October 1979 until March 1982, altogether 380 vehicles. 209 were built by Krauss Maffei and 171 by MaK. The basic equipment consisted of electrical-hydraulic stabiliser WNA-H22, a fire control computer, a laser rangefinder, a wind sensor, a general-purpose telescope EMES 15, a panorama periscope PERI R17, the gunner's primary sight FERO Z18, on the turret roof as well as a computer-controlled tank testing set RPP 1–8. 200 of the vehicles had a low-light enhancer (PZB 200) instead of thermal imaging. Two chassis served as driver training vehicles.

Leopard 2A1
Minor modifications and the installation of the gunner's thermal sight were worked into the second batch of 450 vehicles Leopard 2, designated the A1. Krauss-Maffei built 248 (Chassis Nr. 10211 to 10458) and Mak built 202 (Chassis Nr. 20173 to 20347). Deliveries of the 2A1 models started in March 1982 and ended in November 1983. The two most notable changes were the modification of the ammunition racks to be identical to those in the M1A1 Abrams, and redesigned fuel filters that reduce refuelling time.

A third batch of 300 Leopard 2, 165 by Krauss-Maffei (Chassis Nr. 10459 to 10623) and 135 by MaK (Chassis Nr. 20375 to 20509.), was built between November 1983 and November 1984. This batch included more minor changes that were later retrofitted to the earlier 2A1s.

Leopard 2A2
This designation was given to upgraded vehicles of the first batch of Leopard 2s, brought up to the standard of the second and third batches. This modernisation gradually replaced the original PZB 200 sights in the first batch with thermal sights for the EMES 15 as they became available. The upgrade included the fitting of filler openings and caps to the forward hull fuel tanks to allow separate refuelling. There was an addition of a deflector plate for the periscope and a large coverplate to protect the existing NBC protection system. The tank was given new five metre towing cables with a different position. The programme began in 1984 and ended in 1987. The third, fourth and fifth batches, which were produced during this period, had the same features. The modernised first batch can be recognised by the circular plate covering the hole where the crosswind sensor for the fire control system was removed.

Leopard 2A3
The fourth batch of 300 vehicles, 165 by Krauss-Maffei (Chassis Nr. 10624 to 10788) and 135 by Mak (Chassis Nr. 20510 to 20644), was delivered between December 1984 and December 1985. The main change was the addition of the SEM80/90 digital radio sets (also being fitted to the Leopard 1 at the same time), and the ammunition reloading hatches being welded shut. Even with these minor changes the new batch was known as the 2A3.

Leopard 2A4
The most widespread version of the Leopard 2 family, the 2A4 models included more substantial changes, including an automated fire and explosion suppression system, an all-digital fire control system able to handle new ammunition types, and an improved turret with flat titanium/tungsten armour. The Leopard 2s were manufactured in eight batches between 1985 and 1992. All the older models were upgraded to 2A4 standard. Until 1994, Germany operated a total of 2,125 2A4s (695 newly built and the rest modified older versions), while the Netherlands had an additional 445 tanks. The 2A4 was licensed and manufactured in Switzerland as the Panzer 87 "Leopard" or Pz 87. This version included Swiss-built 7.5 mm MG 87 machine guns and communications equipment and featured an improved NBC protection system. Switzerland operated 380 Pz 87 tanks.

After 2000, Germany and the Netherlands found themselves with large stocks of tanks that they had no need for after the Cold War. These tanks were sold to NATO or friendly armies around the world. Among these buyers of the surplus tanks were Turkey (purchasing 354 vehicles), Greece (183), Sweden (160), Chile (140), Finland (139), Poland (128), Austria (114), Spain (108), Canada (107), Indonesia (103), Singapore (96), Norway (52), Denmark (51), and Portugal (37).

The Pz 87WE (WertErhaltung) is a planned Swiss modification and upgrade of the Pz 87. The modification significantly improves protection through the addition of the Leopard 2A6M's mine protection kit, thicker armour on the front glacis, and a turret equipped with a Swiss-developed armour package using titanium alloy. The turret roof armour is improved and the smoke grenade launchers are redesigned. Further improvements enhance survivability and combat capabilities, such as a turret electric drive similar to the Leopard 2A5, a driver rear-view camera, an independent weapons station for the loader, and enhanced command and control systems. The fire control system is upgraded, using the Carl Zeiss Optronics GmbH PERI-R17A2 fire control system. A remote weapons station containing a fully stabilised Mg 64 0.50 in (12.7 mm) machine gun is fitted to the tank.

The Swiss company RUAG introduced a new upgrade package for Pz 87 main battle tanks, to meet the requirements of the Swiss Army. The tank has improved overall protection. It is fitted with a new modular composite armor package. Armor modules can be tailored to provide enhanced protection against a specific threat. Damaged modules can be easily replaced in field conditions. Upgraded tanks are less vulnerable to direct hits, anti-tank missiles, RPG rounds, mines, and IEDs. The vehicle received new sensors such as a sniper detection sensor and a laser warning receiver.

The Leopard 2 Revolution or Leopard 2RI is an upgraded variant from Rheinmetall for the Leopard 2A4 tank purchased by Indonesia. The upgrade includes AMAP armor from IBD Deisenroth and Rheinmetall Chempro, improved fire control systems, and battlefield management and situational awareness systems.

The Pz 87–140 is an experimental variant of the Swiss Pz 87 with a 140 mm gun and additional armour, which was later used on the newer production variants.

The Leopard 2A4CHL is the upgraded Chilean version of the Leopard 2A4 ordered by Chile in 2007. Upgrades include new electronics, sighting, and information systems meant to elevate the Leopard 2A4's networking capability to be equal to that of the Leopard 2A6, a new suspension system, and the upgrading of the tank main gun to the L/55 smoothbore cannon used on the Leopard 2A6. Other upgrades are remote weapon stations over the gunner and commander hatches fitted with the MG3 and HK GMG. The Leopard 2A4CHL has improved roof and side turret armour and can be uplinked with Chile's battlefield control network.

The Leopard 2A4M CAN is the upgraded Canadian version of the Leopard 2A4 acquired from the Royal Netherlands Army surplus. The Leopard 2A4M CAN is specially designed for the war in Afghanistan, based on experience gained by Leopard 2 operators. The first 20 were delivered in October 2010. Five were deployed to Afghanistan at the end of 2010 and operated until July 2011, when combat operations stopped. Though originally planned to be up-gunned to the L/55 for consistency with the 2A6M CAN, the longer barrelled guns (optimised for tank-vs-tank warfare) were found to be less than ideal in Afghanistan, therefore it was decided to retain the L/44. Only small areas of slat armour were added, in contrast with the fully caged 2A6M CANs. The protection of the Leopard 2A4M CAN has been further augmented by the addition of applique armour resembling that found on the most recent Leopard 2A7+ variant, but modified to fit the turret configuration of the 2A4. Of the 2A4s acquired, 11 were converted for training use (9 A4s, 2 A4Ms). In February 2011, Canada bought 12 2A4s/Pz 87 from Switzerland for the 'Force Mobility Enhancement' project which, along with the remaining unused ex-Dutch tanks, saw 18 converted to Armoured Engineering Vehicles and 4 converted to Armoured Recovery Vehicles. Canada has also purchased 15 2A4s from Germany as Logistic Stock Vehicles (for spare parts).

The Leopard 2NG (Next Generation) is a privately funded Turkish upgrade by ASELSAN that includes the application of AMAP, upgraded optics, completely overhauled turret mechanics, and a new fire control system on the work since 1995 and to be delivered by late 2011, which is intended to be used on the new Altay MBT. It was developed without an order from the Turkish Army, but might meet the requirements for the modernization of the Turkish Leopard 2A4s. The old powerpack and the L/44 gun barrel are kept, but the combat weight is increased to 65 tonnes. According to Turkish news sources, Finland was interested in getting the Turkish upgrade package to modernise their fleet of Leopard 2A4s. However, in 2015 Finland purchased 120 2A6 vehicles from the Netherlands.

The Leopard 2 hull was used for the Vickers Mk 7 main battle tank, which featured a British-designed turret, where some of the innovations later were incorporated into the Challenger 2 design.

In December 2015, Bumar-Labedy signed an agreement with German Rheinmetall Landsysteme Gmbh concerning the technological support of the Polish modernization program for Leopard 2A4 tanks. The company will design, document, and execute six prototypes. The first upgraded Leopard 2PLs have arrived in Poland in June 2020, with all 142 tanks to be delivered by 2023. The upgrades include third generation night vision systems (production of the Warsaw PCO), new additional armor modules and anti-splash lining, removal of flammable components (turret drive system and main propulsion system), installation of the new fire protection system, modernization of the tank's integrated monitoring and testing equipment, the possibility of using new types of ammunition (programmable DM-11 and DM-63), and an auxiliary generator set (APU). Construction of all 142 units will be completed by the end of 2020.

Turkey is planning to modernize its Leopard 2A4 MBTs as Leopard 2A4TR with the T1 Modernization Package. According to the Defense Industry Presidency, Leopard 2A4 tanks will be modernized with; Explosive Reactive Armor (ERA), T1 Reactive-Passive Armor, High Ballistic Strength Cage Armor, Hollow Modular Add-on Armor, Close Range Surveillance System (YAMGÖZ), Laser Warning Receiver System (LIAS), SARP Remote Controlled Weapon System (UKSS), PULAT Active Protection System (AKS), a new power distribution unit, ASELSAN Driver Surveillance System (ADİS) and voice alert system integrations. The modernization programme is to be completed in 2 batches. The programme will start with 84 Leopard 2A4 tanks in the first batch and the remaining tanks will be modernized within the 2nd batch. A total of 334 tanks (including prototypes) are planned to be upgraded with the T1 modernization programme. The new modernized Leopard 2A4 that was presented at the BMC factory was fitted with an Altay turret, which is armed with one 120 mm 55 caliber smoothbore gun designed and manufactured by the Turkish Company MKE, based on a technology transfer from Hyundai Rotem of South Korea. A remote-controlled weapon station is mounted on the top of the turret which is armed with a 12.7mm caliber heavy machine gun.

Leopard 2 Marksman

Finland has modernised its Marksman SPAAG vehicles by replacing the original T-55AM chassis with a newer Leopard 2A4 chassis. The upgraded Marksman vehicles were scheduled to enter service with the Finnish Army in 2016. The new Leopard 2 chassis greatly improves mobility compared to the older T-55AM chassis, both on- and off-road. The Leopard 2 chassis is larger, providing a more stable firing platform for the Marksman turret to operate from.

Leopard 2 Imp
"Leopard 2 Improved" was a prototype-series for enhancing the A4, introducing a wedge-shaped, spaced add-on armour to the turret front and the frontal area of the sides. These spaced armour modules defeat a hollow charge prior to reaching the base armour, and cause kinetic-energy penetrators to change direction, eroding them in the process. It does not form a shot-trap, since it does not deflect the penetrators outwards to hit the hull or turret ring. The gun mantlet was redesigned to accept the new armour.

Leopard 2A5

The Leopard 2 Imp was developed into the A5. There were some improvements in the main armour composition. The interior received spall liners to reduce fragments if the armour is penetrated. The frontal "heavy" third of the side skirts was replaced with a stronger type. The commander's sight was moved to a new position behind the hatch and it received an independent thermal channel. The gunner's sight was moved to the turret roof as opposed to the cavity in the front armour in previous models. A heavier sliding driver's hatch was fitted.

Turret controls went all-electric, increasing reliability and crew safety, as well as weight savings. The gun braking system was improved to prepare for the later mounting of the new L/55 gun tube and to enable firing of more powerful ammunition, such as the DM53 APFSDS. The first A5s were handed over to the German army tank school in 1995 and started to enter regular service with Panzerbataillon 33 in December the same year.

The Leopard 2A5 DK is a variant of the Leopard 2A5 similar to the Leopard 2A6 with some small modifications, used by the Danish Army.

Stridsvagn 122

Based on the Leopard 2 Improved, Stridsvagn 122 is a Swedish Army tank. 120 units were built, 91 of which were licence-produced in Sweden. The tank features increased armour on the turret top and front hull, and improved command-, control- and fire-control systems. Externally, it can be distinguished from the Leopard 2A5 by the French GALIX smoke dispensers, different storage bins, and the much thicker crew hatches. The Strv 122B+ Evolution, a variant equipped with modular AMAP composite armour from IBD Deisenroth, has increased 360° protection against threats like EFPs, RPGs and IEDs. The width of  has been kept, while the weight increases by only .

Leopard 2-140
In the early 1990s, Rheinmetall began development of a 140 mm smoothbore cannon for use in future tank designs. The new gun was intended to counter new Soviet tank developments, especially since the next generation of Soviet main battle tanks were rumoured to be armed with a 135 mm or 152 mm cannon. The new 140 mm cannon was part of a modernisation programme for the Leopard 2 known as the KWS III. Test firing of the new 140 mm cannon was conducted. Results showed that the gun had high penetration values, and had a muzzle velocity of around 2,000 metres a second, with potential to be increased further. However, the 140 mm rounds were too heavy for the tank crew to handle effectively.

The KWS III upgrade was to feature a new turret. This new turret was equipped with the planned 140 mm cannon and an autoloader. The introduction of an autoloader reduced the tank's crew to three members, as a dedicated loader was no longer needed. The gun's 32 rounds of ammunition were stored separate from the crew in a large compartment occupying the entire rear of the turret, in order to increase crew survivability in the event of a cook off. The turntable-style turret had the gun offset to the left side, due to the autoloader's lateral feeding of ammunition into the cannon breech. The turret was powered by an electro-hydraulic drive and featured an IFIS battlefield management system. The crew was protected by an armoured capsule and ballistic protection for the hull was to be improved. The planned protection level of the KWS III upgrade was to be equal to or better than the Leopard 2A5.

A total of 650 Leopard 2 KWS III tanks were originally projected to be purchased. However, in 1995, the KWS III programme was cancelled due to 

Despite this, development continued on the 140 mm cannon, with Rheinmetall coordinating with the British Royal Ordnance and French GIAT companies. The 140 mm cannon was fitted to an old Leopard 2 prototype with the turret T19. Counterweights were added to the rear of the turret to balance the increased weight of the 140 mm cannon. The modified Leopard 2 was not equipped with any other KWS III upgrades apart from the new gun. Live fire testing showed mixed results, where the 140 mm cannon showed superior penetrating power compared to the existing 120 mm cannon, but demonstrated poorer handling characteristics. The lack of the autoloader on the prototype further hampered performance.

Leopard 2A6

The Leopard 2A6 includes the addition of the Rheinmetall 120 mm L/55 smoothbore gun and other changes. All German tank battalions of the "crisis intervention forces" are equipped with the A6. Canada purchased twenty Leopard 2A6s from the Netherlands. These were delivered in 2007. Portugal purchased 37 Leopard 2A6s from the Dutch in 2007, with delivery in 2008. In January 2014, Finland purchased 100 L2A6s, as well as munitions, simulators, and a ten-year supply of reserve parts from the Netherlands. The tanks were delivered in batches between 2015 and 2019.

The Leopard 2A6A1 is a command version of the Leopard 2A6, stemming from the KWS I programme. The vehicle includes additional radios (with the amount depending on the level of command) to accommodate the communications for section, platoon, troop, company, squadron or battalion commanders. For section leaders, the vehicle is fitted with 1x SEM 80 and 1x SEM 90 VHF radios. For platoon or troop commanders, the vehicle is fitted with 1x SEM 80 and 1x SEM 90 VHF radios along with an 800m field telephone cable drum fitted at the rear of the vehicle. For company, squadron or battalion commanders the vehicle is fitted with 2x SEM 80 or 1x SEM 93 and 1x SEM 90 VHF radios along with an 800m field telephone cable drum, for either fitted at the rear of the vehicle.

The Leopard 2A6M is a version of the 2A6 with enhanced mine protection under the chassis, and internal enhancements to improve crew survivability. In the summer of 2007, Canada borrowed 20 A6Ms from Germany for deployment to Afghanistan.

The Leopard 2 Hel is a derivative of the 2A6 that was ordered by the Greek Army in 2003 – the "Hel" stands for "Hellenic". The 170 tanks were delivered between 2006 and 2009. A total of 140 were built in Greece by ELBO, which delivered the first units in late 2006.

The Leopard 2A6M CAN is a Canadian variant of the Leopard 2A6M. Significant modifications include distinctive black boxes mounted on the rear of the turret bustle, and stand-off slat armour. The first tanks configured in this variant were 20 loaned from the German Bundeswehr in an effort to increase firepower and protection given to Canadian troops operating in the south of Afghanistan. The loaned tanks retain their German MG3 machine guns, the ex-Dutch tanks are also expected to retain their FN MAG machine guns due to commonality with Canadian stocks of C6 GPMG, itself a variant of the FN MAG.

Due to the loaned status of the first twenty tanks, the air conditioning unit originally could not be installed, as only minimal changes could be made. The crew wore cooling vests instead, and the turret's electric drive generates less heat than the hydraulic drive of the older Leopard C2. The loaned German tanks will be kept by the Canadian Forces and may be further upgraded, while ex-Dutch Leopard 2A6s were modified to German Leopard 2A6M specifications and used as restitution for the loaned tanks. Canadian Leopard 2s in Afghanistan were later fitted with air conditioning units, a much-needed commodity in the scorching desert of Afghanistan, and Saab's Barracuda camouflage mats, which reduce solar loading by 50 percent.

The Leopard 2A6TR was the Turkish variant during the Turkish Army tank procurement project in 2000. The version was based on 2A6EX. The project was dropped in favor of developing the indigenous Altay tank.

Leopard 2E

The Leopard 2E is a derivative of the 2A6, with greater armour protection, developed under a programme of co-production between the defence industries of Spain and Germany. The programme was developed within the frame of collaboration decided in 1995 between the Defence Ministries of both countries, which also included the cession of use by period of five years of 108 Leopard 2A4 from the German Army to the Spanish Army. The session was extended up to 2016, and after that those tanks will be the sole property of the Spanish Army, as has been made public in January 2006, then having been paid a total of €15,124,014 in ten yearly installments, giving the Spanish co-ownership from 2006.

In 1998, the Spanish government agreed to locally build 219 tanks of the Leopard 2E line, 16 recovery tanks of Leopard 2ER (Buffalo), and 4 training vehicles. They chose Santa Bárbara Sistemas as the main contractor. The programme, with a budget of €1,939.4 million, includes integrated logistical support, training courses for crew instructors and maintenance engineers, and driving, turret, maintenance, aiming, and shooting simulators. Deliveries of the first batch began in 2004.

Leopard 2PL 

The Leopard 2PL is a Polish modernized version of the Leopard 2A4, carried out in cooperation with Rheinmetall and the Polish Armaments Group (pol. Polska Grupa Zbrojeniowa PGZ). The Leopard 2PL MBT is primarily tasked with assault, maintaining territory, and supporting mechanized and motorized subdivisions with its onboard weapon systems in all weather conditions during the day and night. The main upgrades when compared to the Leopard 2A4 include modernization of the commander's and gunner's sight, additional ballistic modules on the turret, replacement of the hydraulic stabilization system with a new electric system, and new fire extinguishing and fire suppression systems.

The upgrade included a new commander's control and monitoring system, the installation of an auxiliary power unit (APU), a new turret stowage compartment for crew equipment, the modernization of its main gun to use new types of programmable ammunition, and the integration of day/night rear camera for drivers. Included are customized towing vehicles due to the increased weight of the upgraded tank. The upgraded 2PL version is in service with the Polish Land Forces. Of the Leopard 2A4s from the first (128) and the second (14) batches, 24 have been upgraded to Leopard 2PL standard. The rest will be upgraded to the 2PLM1 standard.

Leopard 2 PSO

The new Leopard 2 PSO (Peace Support Operations) variant is designed especially for urban warfare, which had been encountered in peacekeeping operations with increasing frequency. The Leopard 2 PSO is equipped with more effective all-around protection, a secondary weapons station, improved reconnaissance ability, a bulldozer blade, a shorter gun barrel for manoeuvring on urban streets at the expense of fire range, non-lethal armament, close-range surveillance ability through camera systems, a searchlight and further changes to improve its perseverance and mobility in built-up non-wide open areas. These features are similar to the Tank Urban Survival Kit for the American M1A2 Abrams.

Leopard 2A7
The Leopard 2A7 vehicle is not intended to be optimized for combat in urban terrain, thus it is fundamentally different from the KMW variant, the: 2A7+ (see below). A total of 20 vehicles were provided for converting. It involves former Dutch A6NL models returned by Canada to Germany. The original upgrade to A6M has been extended in coordination with Canada and includes a crew-compartment cooling-system from the Leopard 2 A6M-HEL series, a new 20 kW auxiliary power unit based on the Steyr Motors M12 TCA UI engine, the Saab Barracuda Mobile Camouflage System (MCS) with Heat-Transfer Reduction (HTR CoolCam) system, a field trial proven combat management and information system (IFIS: Integriertes Führungs- und Informationssystem), onboard network optimization with ultracapacitors in the chassis and turret, a SOTAS IP digital intercom system, a renewal of the fire suppression system in the crew compartment, and the retrofitting of Attica thermal imaging module in the commander optics.

The weapon system is adapted for firing HE ammunition. It is fitted for, but not with, additional passive side protection armour. The first Leopard 2A7 was handed over to the German Army in Munich in December 2014. 14 vehicles were produced for Tank Battalion 203, 4 went to the Armoured Corps Training Centre and one vehicle went to the Technical School for Land Systems and School for Technology of the Army. The last tank remains as a reference vehicle at KMW. The tank features a completely new armour package that features Tungsten, Titanium as well as Nano-Ceramics. The estimated armour protection for the hull is around ~620 mm RHAe KE, and near ~1000 mm RHAe KE for the turret.

The Danish Armed Forces received its first Leopard 2A7 main battle tanks upgraded in Germany from the Leopard 2A5DK version at the Dragoon Barracks in Holstebro. The Danish Army will receive a total of 44 Leopard 2A7 vehicles by 2022.

Siemon T. Wezeman, senior researcher at SIPRI's arms transfers and military expenditure programme, stated that information from the UN Register of Conventional Arms 2016, indicated that some Leopard 2A7s were transferred to Singapore after 2014. SIPRI reported that the Singapore Army probably acquired a total of 45 Leopard 2A7s between 2016 and 2019, but the Singapore's Ministry of Defence denied having acquired the 2A7 version, presumably to minimise anxiety among her neighbors.

In February 2023, Norway ordered 54 Leopard 2A7 tanks to be delivered from 2026, with a further option for 18 vehicles if necessary.

Leopard 2A7+

The Leopard 2A7+ was first shown to the public during the Eurosatory 2010, featuring the label "Developed by KMW – tested and qualified by the German Ministry of Defence". The Leopard 2A7+ has been tested by the Bundeswehr under the name UrbOp (urban operations).

The Leopard 2A7+ is designed to operate both in low-intensity and high-intensity conflicts. The tank's protection has been increased by modular armour. The frontal protection has been improved with a dual kit on the turret and hull front, while 360° protection against RPGs and mine protection increase the survivability of the tank in urban operations. The modular armour's system components were first used by Canada in Afghanistan. It can fire programmable High Explosive munitions. The turret-mounted MG3 has been replaced with a stabilised FLW 200 remotely controlled weapon station. Mobility, sustainability, and situational awareness have also been improved.

In December 2018, Hungary ordered 44 2A7+s, making them the second operator of the improved version, after Qatar.

Engineering and driver training tanks

Bergepanzer BPz3 Büffel (Gr. Buffalo) The BPz3 armoured recovery vehicle includes both a bulldozer and a crane with integral winch, allowing it to approach damaged vehicles, even over rough and fought-over terrain, and tow them to safety. It is equipped with a machine gun for local self-defence, a smoke grenade launcher, and NBC protection. Like the tank, it is powered by a 1,500 PS (1,479 hp, 1,103 kW) diesel engine. It is in service with Germany (where it is also designated Büffel or Bergepanzer 3 for Salvage Tank 3), the Netherlands (who co-developed it and calls it Buffel), Canada, Greece, Singapore (where it is called L2-ARV locally), Spain (where it is called Leopard 2ER Búfalo), Sweden (in modified form as the Bgbv 120) and Switzerland (BPz3).

Panzerschnellbrücke 2 This vehicle, created by MAN Mobile Bridges GmbH, is an armoured vehicle-launched bridge developed from the Leopard 2 tank chassis. It is designed to carry a folding mobile bridge, which it can "launch" across a river. Once emplaced, the bridge is sturdy enough to support most vehicles, even other Leopard tanks. When the crossing is complete, the bridge layer simply hooks up to the bridge and re-stows it.

Panzerschnellbrücke Leguan This modular system combines a bridge module created by MAN Mobile Bridges GmbH with a tank chassis. The Bundeswehr is testing the Leguan on Leopard 2 chassis.

AEV 3 Kodiak The AEV 3 Kodiak is a combat engineering vehicle conversion of the Leopard 2 used by the Netherlands, Singapore, Sweden, and Switzerland. It is equipped with a bulldozer blade, excavator arm, and dual capstan winches.  In lieu of a turret, a Remote Weapon Station or other armaments can be fitted. It is built on the Leopard 2 chassis with a built-up forward superstructure. The vehicle is used primarily for the clearance of obstacles, including minefields. The Dutch version has additional bomblet protection for the crew compartments. Spain may procure 24 examples for the Spanish Army from converted Leopard 2A4 hulls (one vehicle has been trialled in Spain) and the type will be offered to Germany.

Driver Training Tank (Fahrschulpanzer) The Leopard 2 Driver Training Tank, as the name implies, is a non-combatant Leopard 2 for instructing soldiers in the finer points of handling the tank. The turret is supplanted by a weighted and fixed observation cab with forward and side-facing windows and a dummy gun. The instructor rides in this cab, with override controls for critical systems, and space is provided for two other students to observe.

Leopard 2R A heavy mine breaching vehicle developed by Patria for the Finnish Army, based on the Leopard 2A4. Ten vehicles were converted. The vehicles are equipped with a mine plough or a dozer blade, and an automated marking system.

Leopard 2L An armoured vehicle-launched bridge developed by KMW and Patria for the Finnish Army. Ten Finnish 2A4 tanks were re-built to carry the LEGUAN bridge.

WISENT 2 A multi-purpose, Leopard 2–based Armoured Support Vehicle developed by Flensburger Fahrzeugbau. The vehicle's modular design allows it to be converted quickly from an Armoured Recovery Vehicle (ARV) to an Armoured Engineer Vehicle (AEV) in less than five hours.

Technical data

Operators

Current operators

Potential operators
: The Bulgarian Ministry of Defence has been interested in purchasing a minimum of 24 units of the Leopard 2A6 variant. The deal has received support from a military budget increase to 2.0% of GDP by 2016 in the new Bulgarian budget, and a military pledge to spend €2.2 billion on new armaments for the Bulgarian military.
 : The Croatian Ministry of Defence is looking to replace its M-84A4 tanks currently in use. Negotiations with Germany over the purchase of stored Leopard 2A5 tanks were underway in 2014 and 2015. The Milanović Government was negotiating the purchase of up to 50 tanks with spare parts and a support package including spare engines, tank transporters, and engineering vehicles valued at 875 million kunas. The purchase would have coincided with the purchase of PzH 2000 howitzers. Due to budget constraints, at least for the time being, the vehicles were not purchased. Interest still remains high, as Croatia has no plans to modernise or maintain its M-84A4 tanks beyond 2020.
 : In March 2023 it was reported that the Italian Army is considering the purchase of up to 250 Leopard 2A7 tanks for roughly €8 billion. 
 : As part of a modernization program, since 2019 the Romanian Army has been considering the acquisition of Leopard 2 tanks. However, in March 2023 Romania's Ministry of Defense announced they had opted to purchase around 54 M1 Abrams tanks from the United States.

Failed bids 
: The Saudi Arabian government sought to buy Leopard 2A7s (total of 600–800 desired). In early July 2011, the German press reported that the Bundessicherheitsrat approved the sale by KMW of more than 200 units of the 2A7+ tanks to Saudi Arabia. This news was met with criticism both inside and outside of Germany, because of the autocratic nature of the Saudi Arabian state and its involvement in repressing popular protests in the neighboring country of Bahrain. Criticism also came from within the Chancellor Angela Merkel's government coalition, and, later from within KMW.  In June 2012, reports surfaced that Saudi Arabia had raised the number of tanks it was interested into 600–800. A contract was never finalized, and the issue was debated both in the German public and in Germany's federal parliament. In April 2014, a German newspaper reported that the deal for Leopard 2 tanks for Saudi Arabia was likely to be cancelled due to opposition from the Federal Economy Minister at that time, Social Democrat Sigmar Gabriel. In 2015, Germany blocked the sale of Leopard 2 tanks to Saudi Arabia.

See also
 Leopard 1
 List of main battle tanks by generation
 Panther KF51
 Tanks in the German Army

Notes

References

Bibliography

External links
 Leopard 2 Revolution
 Army Vehicles.DK Leopard 2A5
 Army Vehicles.DK Leopard 2A4
 Military Periscope – Leopard 2 main battle tank
 Fprado.com – Kampfpanzer Leopard 2
 Leopard 2A5
 A Finnish Army Leopard 2A4 firing from a hull-down position
 A Finnish Leopard 2A4 firing, videoed from inside the turret
 Danish Leopard 2A5
 Singapore Leopard 2A4 MBT

Articles containing video clips
Main battle tanks of the Cold War
Cold War tanks of Germany
Military vehicles introduced in the 1970s
Main battle tanks of Germany
Main battle tanks of Sweden
Main battle tanks of Spain
Main battle tanks of Poland
Main battle tanks of Slovakia